India competed at the 1928 Summer Olympics in Amsterdam, Netherlands.  The men's field hockey team won the gold medal, beginning a streak that continued through the 1956 Games.

Medalists

Athletics

Seven athletespresed India in 1928.
Ranks given are within the heat.

Men
Field Events

Hockey

Roster

Gold Medal Match

References
Official Olympic Reports
International Olympic Committee results database

Nations at the 1928 Summer Olympics
1928